Volleyball tournaments have been staged at the Universiade since 1959. The men's tournament was introduced at the 1959 Summer Universiade, while the women's tournament was introduced at the 1961 Summer Universiade. After not being included in 1975 and 1989.

Medal winners

Men's tournament

Women's tournament

Medal table 
Last updated after the 2019 Summer Universiade

See also
Volleyball at the Summer Olympics
Volleyball at the Mediterranean Games

External links 
Sports123
Todor 66

 
Sports at the Summer Universiade
Universiade